Aati amaase (Tulu:ಆಟಿ ಅಮಾಸೆ) it is also called as Aati Amavese, Ashada Amavase, Aati Amavasye, Deevige Karkataka Amavasya or Bhimana Amavasya. It is celebrated in the Aati month of the tulu calendar in Tulunadu region on the new moon day. Aati is the fourth month of the oldest traditional Indian solar calendar.  On this auspicious day tulunadu people drink Paaleda Kashaya which is bitter in taste. It cleans the digestive tracts systems and is said to have loads of medicinal power to fight diseases. Therefore, people advised to have paaleda kashaya on an empty stomach. Tuluva being the worshipers of Mother Nature, show gratitude towards this divine tree.

Paale ketteda kashaya 
Tulunadu people drink ‘Paale ketteda kashaya’, a bitter Ayurvedic decoction to mark Aati Amavasya day, in the households. The Paale mara(Tulu Language) or Saptaparni in Sanskrit, Halemara in Kannada, botanically known as Alstonia scholaris is also known as Devil tree in English.

The Kashaya (decoction) preparation 

Traditionally, people of tulunadu used to clean the surroundings of paale mara the previous day of new moon day and tie the tree with rope dry banana leaves and keep a stone under the tree. So, they can identify the paale mara  easily in the early morning and pray with the tree, "Hey divine Tree, you fill with the entire medicinal aspects tomorrow. Please bless with good health after having your bark/skin".  It also has divine status in this region. On aati amaase day, (the next day) before sunrise  the bark/skin of the paale mara should be collected with the help of a stone and decoction prepared from it. The special care should be taken in the identification of the tree. Very outer skin(black coloured) is removed and inner white part is crushed by adding a little water, to make kashaya. The tree bark is grinded  by using a  stone. And this ayurvedic concoction is prepared by mixing ingredients of  pepper, turmeric, ajwain, garlic, and seeds into it. And  scorch a pebble or iron bar and place in the decoction. After oblation  to god and finally people intake the Kashaya. It tastes highly bitter, because it has ensemble medicinal contents. This juice  is called Paaleda kashaya.

After intake of Kashaya, there is a habit of eating roasted cashews,pappads and Shendige, menthe and coconut rice.

Aati Agel 
On amavase day evening tulu people make " Guru karnvereg Agel". Agel is a system of arranging meals to our ancestors. It  is a kind of religious belief of tuluvas. All the   members of the family are gathered together to prepare the Agel. They usually prepare and serve  neer dosa, chicken curry and country alcohol to offer the  demi spirits, deities  and departed forefathers of tulu people.

proverb 
Proverb in Tulu "aati aned popini, sona kudred popini" which means aati travels slowly with no work at home like riding on an Elephant, and sona travels as fast as if riding on a horse!

References 

Tulu language
Religious festivals in India